Antonio Lombardo (died 1597) was a Roman Catholic prelate who served as Archbishop of Messina (1585–1597), Bishop of Agrigento (1579–1585), and Bishop of Mazara del Vallo (1573–1579).

Biography
On 16 January 1573, Antonio Lombardo was appointed during the papacy of Pope Gregory XIII as Bishop of Mazara del Vallo.
On 30 March 1579, he was appointed during the papacy of Pope Gregory XIII as Bishop of Agrigento.
On 23 January 1585, he was appointed during the papacy of Pope Gregory XIII as Archbishop of Messina.
He served as Archbishop of Messina until his death on 13 September 1597.

References

External links and additional sources
 (for Chronology of Bishops) 
 (for Chronology of Bishops) 
 (for Chronology of Bishops)
 (for Chronology of Bishops) 
 (for Chronology of Bishops) 
 (for Chronology of Bishops) 

16th-century Roman Catholic bishops in Sicily
Bishops appointed by Pope Gregory XIII
1597 deaths